is a railway station in the city of Murakami, Niigata, Japan, operated by East Japan Railway Company (JR East).

Lines
Imagawa Station is served by the Uetsu Main Line, and is 82.6 kilometers from the starting point of the line at Niitsu Station.

Station layout
The station consists of two ground-level opposed side platforms connected by a level crossing. The station is unattended.

Platforms

History
Imagawa Station opened on 1 April 1987.

Surrounding area
 Imagawa Swimming Beach

See also
 List of railway stations in Japan

External links

 JR East station information 

Stations of East Japan Railway Company
Railway stations in Niigata Prefecture
Uetsu Main Line
Railway stations in Japan opened in 1987
Murakami, Niigata